Biliya is a village in Udaipur district in the Indian state of Rajasthan. The District head quarter of the village is Udaipur. It is 13 kilometers away from the Udaipur district headquarters. As per Population Census 2011, the total population of Biliya is 350. Males constitute 49% of the population and females 51%. The literacy rate of Biliya village is 60.0% as per 2011 census.

References 

Villages in Udaipur district